Porcari is a comune (municipality) in the Province of Lucca in the Italian region Tuscany, located about  west of Florence and about  east of Lucca.

In the Middle Ages it was a stage on the Via Francigena. It houses the church of St. Justus, dating to the 16th century but later mostly remade in neo-medieval style.

References

External links
 Official website

Cities and towns in Tuscany